The Korea Research Institute of Standards and Science (KRISS) is the national measurement standards laboratory for the Republic of Korea. It is a government-funded institute responsible for providing national measurement standards and advancing measurement technologies. KRISS is also an active member of the General Conference on Weights and Measures (CGPM).

History
KRISS was established in 1975 as the Korea Standards Research Institute, and initiated calibration services in 1979. The institute became known as the Korea Research Institute of Standards and Science in 1991.

In 1999, KRISS was officially designated to serve as the national metrology institute by the Framework Act on National Standards (Article 13). It maintains South Korea's primary measurement standards. The first woman to head the organization was Kwang Hwa Chung, who became president in 2005 and served through 2008.

See also 
 HLA (radio station), time signal broadcast by KRISS
 Metrology

References

Citations

Bibliography
 .

External links
 

Multidisciplinary research institutes
Standards organizations in South Korea
1975 establishments in South Korea
Organizations established in 1975